Marinda Airport , also known as Raja Ampat Airport, is an airport serving Waisai, Raja Ampat Regency, Southwest Papua, Indonesia. The airport serves as one of the main port of entry to the Raja Ampat Islands, which contains the richest marine biodiversity on earth, other than the larger Domine Eduard Osok Airport in Sorong.  Marinda Airport was inaugurated on 9 May 2012 by  former Minister of Transport E. E. Mangindaan. The airport was built due to the rapid increase of tourism coming to Raja Ampat Islands and the remoteness of the surrounding area, which was very difficult to access before. Currently, the airport can only accommodate small aircraft such as the ATR-72.

The initial construction of the airport was carried out in 2007, five years after Raja Ampat became its own regency. In 2010 there was a runway with a length of 800 meters with a width of 18 meters which was financed by government funds. In 2012 the runway was extended and widened to 1,200 meters at 30 meters by government funds. On December 19, 2014, the airport originally managed by the Work Unit (Satker) turned into a UPBU. Due to the pursuit of the Raja Ampat Sail which was attended by President Susilo Bambang Yudhoyono and other state officials, the runway was extended again to 1,400 meters. The apron was expanded to 90 meters by 75 meters using government funds. It also built a building for power house, generator with a capacity of 150 Kwh, buildings and fire trucks.

Airlines and destinations

Statistics

References 

Airports in Southwest Papua